The Banking, Finance and Insurance Commission (CBFA) was the financial regulatory agency for Belgium.  It was replaced by a new agency, the Financial Services and Markets Authority (FSMA) on 1 April 2011 as part of a restructuring of the financial regulatory system in Belgium.

History
The CBFA was formed in 2004 with the merger of Insurance Supervisory Authority ( CDV), which was originally created in 1975, and the Banking and Finance Commission ( CBF), which was created in 1935, to form a single agency to regulate all financial markets in Belgium.

It was replaced by the Financial Services and Markets Authority (FSMA) when the Law of 2 July 2010 was implemented.  This was to develop the supervision of the financial sector towards a bipartite model known as the "Twin Peaks" model.  This bipartite model is intended to provide a structure for the two major objectives of the supervision of the financial sector;
 maintaining the macro- and microeconomic stability of the financial system, which falls within the competence of the central bank, that is, the National Bank of Belgium;
 ensuring that market processes are equitable and transparent, that relationships between market participants are appropriate and that clients are treated honestly, fairly and professionally (notably from the perspective of rules of conduct), tasks which fall henceforth within the competence of the Financial Services and Markets Authority (FSMA), formerly the CBFA.

See also
Economy of Belgium
National Bank of Belgium
Securities Commission

References

External links 
Prudential Supervision, National Bank of Belgium website
Financial Services and Markets Authority

Finance in Belgium
Belgium
Federal departments and agencies of Belgium
Defunct government agencies of Belgium
Regulation in Belgium